Patrick Leo Kenny-Gibson (born 19 April 1995) is an Irish actor known for his roles in The Tudors, The Passing Bells The OA, The White Princess and Tolkien . He was awarded Rising Star at the 2017 IFTAs.

Early life and education
Gibson was born in central London. His father is also an actor and his mother works in marketing. Upon returning to Ireland, the family lived in Greystones, then Stillorgan, and later Donnybrook. Gibson attended Gonzaga College. He began his studies in Philosophy at Trinity College Dublin, but left halfway through his degree in 2016 upon being cast in The OA.

Filmography

Film

Television

References

External links

Living people
1995 births
21st-century Irish male actors
Irish expatriates in England
Irish male film actors
Irish male television actors
People educated at Gonzaga College
People from the City of Westminster
People from Donnybrook, Dublin
People from Greystones
People from Stillorgan
Place of birth missing (living people)